Kifano Jordan (born April 14, 1982), better known as Shotti, is a Trinidadian-American convicted felon and former affiliate of Tr3yway Entertainment rapper 6ix9ine. During their tenure, Shotti provided interludes on his singles such as "Billy" and "Blood Walk". He is also a known member of the Nine Trey Gangsters, a set of the larger United Blood Nation which is the East Coast branch of the Bloods gang.

Early life
Kifano Jordan was born on April 14, 1982, in the Caribbean island of Trinidad, in the nation of Trinidad and Tobago, and later moved at a young age to the United States, settling in Bedford–Stuyvesant, Brooklyn, New York City.

Musical career
Jordan has stated that he met 6ix9ine through a mutual friendship with Maino before their musical careers. In April 2018, Jordan was sentenced to 7 months of community jail after being ruled as a person of interest in a Barclays Center shooting. He has affiliation with the street gangs United Blood Nation's set Nine Trey Gangsters.

Legal issues
In late 2018, Jordan was tied to a series of felony assaults, including 3 shootings and multiple drug and firearm charges. Jordan has also served as a co-defendant for 6ix9ine's November 2018 racketeering trial. On March 28, 2019, Jordan pled guilty in the United States District Court for the Southern District of New York to multiple charges with a sentencing possibility of up to 15 years to life in prison. On September 6, 2019, Jordan was sentenced to 15 years in prison.

References

1982 births
Living people
American people of Trinidad and Tobago descent
People from Bedford–Stuyvesant, Brooklyn
American music industry executives
Bloods
Nine Trey Gangsters